Chipewyan  Lake is an unincorporated community in northern Alberta within the Municipal District of Opportunity No. 17. The community is not accessible by Alberta's provincial highway system. It is however accessible by using the Laricina Energy/Shell Canada S-4 access road.

Chipewyan Lake was placed under mandatory evacuation order on May 30, 2019, due to out-of-control wildfires in the area.

Demographics 

See also 
List of communities in Alberta
List of designated places in Alberta

References 

Designated places in Alberta
Localities in the Municipal District of Opportunity No. 17